Amb. Mohamed Sheikh Hassan or Mohamed Sheikh Hassan Nuriye  also referred to as His Excelleny H.E Mohamed Sheikh,was a  prominent ambassador for Somalia. Mohamed Sheikh Hassan was 1 of the 3 ambassadorial brothers from Ethiopia, Djibouti and Somalia, all ethnic Somalis, the other 2 brothers were  Adan Sheikh Hassan and Ismail Sheikh Hassan.  All from the same  prominent family who were one of the most interesting in the Horn of Africa. The first time in history 3 Somali brothers managed to become ambassadors in 3 different neighboring countries.

History 
Mohamed hails from a prominent family who were one of the most interesting in the Horn of Africa. They are known as the Ambassadorial Brothers. His father Sheikh Hassan Nuriye was a prominent Sheikh in Ethiopia, Djibouti and Somalia. Sheikh Hassan had sired three sons who represented three African countries at ambassadorial level.

Mohamed brothers are Ismail Sheikh Hassan who represented Ethiopia at ambassadorial level and was the Ethiopian ambassador to Libya. His other brother Adan was the Djiboutian ambassador to Oman and the Kingdom of Saudi Arabia.

Mohamed Sheikh Hassan belongs to the Rer Ughaz (Reer Ugaas), Makahiildheere (Makahildere), subsection of the Makahiil (Makahil) branch of the Gadabursi (Gadabuursi).  Mohamed served his country as ambassador to United Arab Republic, then Canada and afterwards ambassador to Nigeria and South Africa.

Career 
 Ambassador for United Arab Republic (1969)
 Ambassador for Somalia to Canada
 Director General Foreign Ministry Somalia
 Ambassador for Somalia to Nigeria
 Ambassador for Somalia to South Africa

Family tree 
 Sheikh Hassan Nuriye, Father of all 3 Ambassadors and prominent Sheikh in all 3 countries
 Mohamed Sheikh Hassan - Ambassador for Somalia to United Arab Republic,  Canada and Nigeria
 Ismail Sheikh Hassan - Ambassador for Ethiopia to Libya
 Aden Sheikh Hassan - Ambassador for Djibouti to Oman and Saudi Arabia

References 

Somalian diplomats
Gadabuursi